Auti Angel (October 15, 1969 - March 23, 2022) was an American entertainer.

Angel was born in San Diego and raised in Torrance, California. At 18, she launched a professional dancing, choreography, and music career. She was paralyzed from the waist down in a 1992 car accident and continued her career. She was a main character on the 2012 The Sundance Channel reality television series Push Girls, which won a Critics Choice Award for "Best Reality TV Show". She was also one of the stars in the HBO film Musical Chairs. She died March 22, 2022, of breast cancer.

Filmography
Wings of Legacy (2006) (Auti)
Musical Chairs (2011) (Nicky)
Hollywood Sex Wars (2011) (Wheelchair Dancer)
Only Human (2019) (Angel)
Commander in Chief (2020) (Wheelchair)

References

External links

1969 births
2022 deaths
American choreographers
American television actresses
American people with disabilities
People from Torrance, California
Participants in American reality television series
People with paraplegia
American film actresses
Actresses from San Diego
21st-century American actresses
Actors with disabilities